Bafoulabé Airport  is an airstrip serving Bafoulabé, a town and commune in the Bafoulabé Cercle of the Kayes Region of Mali. Bafoulabé is on the Senegal River at its confluence from the Bafing and Bakoy Rivers. The airport is just west of the town.

See also
Transport in Mali
List of airports in Mali

References

External links
OpenStreetMap - Bafoulabé
OurAirports - Bafoulabé

Airports in Mali